Daren Tomas Zenner (May 30, 1971 – May 13, 2020) was a Canadian professional boxer that competed in the super middleweight and light heavyweight weight divisions. He challenged once for the WBO light heavyweight title in 1997.

Zenner fought notable boxers that included world champions and contenders such as Arthur Williams, Lou Del Valle, Tony Thornton and Dariusz Michalczewski.

Amateur career
Zenner grew up in Bezanson, Alberta, and won a gold medal at the Alberta Winter Games in 1988 in boxing which were held in Red Deer, Alberta.

Professional career
Zenner moved to the Las Vegas when he turned professional at the age of 18.

In October 1995, Zenner became the New York State super middleweight champion by beating the nephew of Joe Frazier; Tyrone Frazier.

In December 1997, Zenner competed for the WBO Light Heavyweight Title against undefeated Dariusz Michalczewski in Hamburg, Germany. The fight was stopped due to cuts on Zenner in the 6th round.

After boxing
Following retirement from boxing in 2000, Zenner began a new career within the real-estate industry whilst living in Long Island.

Zenner was married and had four daughters.

Zenner returned to Canada in 2018 where he died suddenly in May 2020.

Professional boxing record

References

External links

1971 births
2020 deaths
Sportspeople from Alberta
American people of Canadian descent
Canadian male boxers
American male boxers
Super-middleweight boxers